Montegrosso is a commune in the Haute-Corse department of France on the island of Corsica. It is a gathering of three villages: Montemaggiore, Lunghiniano and Zillia.

Montegrosso is named after the surrounding mountain, Montegrosso (the "Big Mountain"), and located 1O miles from Calvi.

Population

See also
Communes of the Haute-Corse department

References

Communes of Haute-Corse
Haute-Corse communes articles needing translation from French Wikipedia